This is an incomplete list of paintings by the Irish-born British painter Francis Bacon (1909–1992).

1930s
c.1929–30
Painting (Oil on canvas, 91.5 cm × 61 cm, Private Collection (long term loan to the Tate Gallery))
1933
Crucifixion (Oil on canvas, 60.5 cm × 47 cm, Private collection of Damien Hirst (Murderme), London)
c.1936
Figures in a Garden (aka Seated Figure, The Fox and the Grapes, and Goering and his Lion Cub) (Oil on canvas, 74 cm × 94 cm, Tate Gallery, London)

1940s
1944
Three Studies for Figures at the Base of a Crucifixion (Oil and pastel on Sundeala board, 94 cm × 74 cm (37 in × 29 in), Tate, London) (large triptych)
1945
Figure in a landscape (Oil on canvas, 144.8 cm × 128.3 cm, Tate, London)
1945–46
Figure Study I (Oil on canvas, 123 cm × 105.5 cm, Scottish National Gallery of Modern Art, Edinburgh)
Figure Study II (Oil on canvas, 145 cm x 129 cm, Huddersfield Art Gallery, Huddersfield)
1946
Painting (Oil and pastel on linen, 197.8 cm × 132.1 cm (6.5 7/8 x 52 in), Museum of Modern Art, New York City)
1947–48
Head I (Oil and tempera on hardboard, 100.3 cm × 74.9 cm (39.5 x 29.5 in), Metropolitan Museum of Art, New York City)
1949
Head II (Oil on canvas, 80 x 63.6 cm (31.4 x 25 in), Ulster Museum, Belfast)
Head III (Oil on canvas, 81 x 66 cm (32 x 26 in), Private collection)
Head IV (Man with a Monkey) (Oil on canvas, 82 x 66 cm, (32.4 x 26 in) Private collection)
Head V (Oil on canvas) Private collection)
Head VI (Oil on canvas, 93.2 cm × 76.5 cm (36.6 x 30.1in), Arts Council Collection, London)

1950s
1951
Pope I – Study after Pope Innocent X by Velazquez (Oil and sand on canvas, 197.8 x 137.4 cm (78 x 54 in), Aberdeen Art Gallery, Aberdeen)
1952
Man Eating a Leg of Chicken (Oil on canvas), Collezione Maramotti, Reggio Emilia)
Study for Crouching Nude (Oil and sand on canvas, 137.1 x 198.1 cm (54 × 78 in), Detroit Institute of Arts, Michigan)
Study of a Dog (Oil on canvas, 198.1 cm × 137.2 cm, Tate Gallery, London)
Study of a Figure in a Landscape (Oil on canvas, 198.12 x 137.16 cm (78 x 54 in), Phillips Collection, Washington D.C.) 
Study for a Portrait (aka Businessman I and Man's Head) (Oil on canvas, 66.1 cm × 56.1 cm, Tate Gallery, London)
1953

 Two Figures (Oil on canvas, 152.5 cm × 116.5 cm (60.0 in × 45.9 in), Private Collection.

Study after Velázquez's Portrait of Pope Innocent X (Oil on canvas, 152.1 × 117.8 cm (59 7/8 × 46 3/8 in), Des Moines Art Center, Des Moines)
Study of a Baboon (Oil on canvas, 198.3 x 137.3 cm (6.6 x 54 in), Museum of Modern Art, New York City)
Study from the Human Body (Oil on canvas, 147.2 x 130.6 cm (57.8 x 51.4in), National Gallery of Victoria, Melbourne)
Study for a Portrait (Oil on canvas, 152.3 x 117 cm (60 x 46 in), Private collection)
Study for Portrait VI (Oil on canvas, 151.45 x 116.21 cm (59 5/8 x 45 3/4 in), Minneapolis Institute of Arts, Minnesota)
Study for Portrait VII (Oil on canvas, 152.3 x 117 cm (60 x 46 in), Museum of Modern Art, New York City)
Study of the Sphinx (Oil on canvas, 214 x 153 cm  (84.2 x 60.2 in), Yale University Art Gallery, New Haven, Connecticut)
1954
Man in Blue IV (Oil on canvas, 137 × 197.96 cm (53.94 x 77.95 in), mumok, Vienna)
 Figure with Meat
1955
Head in Grey (Oil on canvas, 60.9 x 51 cm (24.1 × 20.1 in), Walker Art Center, Minnesota)
Study for Portrait II (after the Life Mask of William Blake) (Oil on canvas, 60.1 cm × 50.8 cm, Tate Gallery, London)
Figure Sitting (The Cardinal) (Oil on canvas, 178.5 cm × 143.5 cm (70.2 x 56.4in), Stedelijk Museum voor Actuele Kunst, Ghent)
1956
Figures in a Landscape (Oil on canvas, 150 x 107.5 cm  (59 x 42.3 in), Birmingham Museum and Art Gallery, Birmingham)
Self-Portrait (Oil on canvas, 198.12 × 137.16 cm (78 x 54 in), Modern Art Museum of Fort Worth, Texas)
Study for Figure No. 4 (Oil on canvas, 152.4 cm × 116.8 cm (60 x 45.9in), Art Gallery of South Australia, Adelaide)
Study for Portrait, Number IV (After the Life Mask of William Blake) (Oil on canvas, each 61.1 x 50.8 cm (24 1/8 x 20 in), Museum of Modern Art, New York City) (small triptych)
1956–57
Study for Portrait No.6 (Oil on canvas, 149 x 116 cm (58.6 x 45.6 in), Hatton Gallery, Newcastle upon Tyne)
1957
Study for a Portrait of Van Gogh IV (Oil on canvas, 152.4 cm × 116.8 cm, Tate Gallery, London)
Study for a Portrait of Van Gogh VI (Oil on canvas, 198.1 cm × 142.2 cm (78 x 56in), Arts Council Collection, London)
Study for Chimpanzee (Oil on canvas, 152.4 x 117 cm (60 x 46 1/16 in), Peggy Guggenheim Collection, Venice)
1958
Pope with Owls (Oil on canvas, 198 cm × 1422 cm (78 x 56in), Museum of Modern Arts, Brussels)

1960s
1959–60
Walking Figure (Oil on canvas, 158.12 × 142.24 cm (78 x 56 in), Dallas Museum of Art, Texas)
1960
Nude, 1960, oil on canvas 152,4 x 119,7 cm, Museum für Moderne Kunst Frankfurt, former Ströher Collection Darmstadt
Seated Figure (Oil on canvas, 152.8 x 119.5 cm, (60 1/8 x 47 in), Private collection)
1961
Reclining Woman (Oil on canvas, 198.8 cm × 141.6 cm, Tate Gallery, London)
Seated Figure (Oil on canvas, 165.1 cm × 142.2 cm, Tate Gallery, London)
1962
Figure in a Room (Oil on canvas, 198.8 × 144.7 cm (78.2 × 56.9 in), Leeum, Samsung Museum of Art, Seoul)
Study for Three Heads (Oil on canvas, 35.9 x 30.8 cm (14 x 12 in), Museum of Modern Art, New York City)
Three Studies for a Crucifixion (Oil and sand on canvas, 198.2 x 145 cm (78 x 57 in), Solomon R. Guggenheim Museum, New York City) (large triptych)
1963
Figure with Two Owls, Study for Velazquez (Oil on canvas, 198.12 x 144.78 cm (78 x 57 in), San Francisco Museum of Modern Art, San Francisco) 
Portrait of Henrietta Moraes (Oil on canvas, 165.1 x 142.2 cm (65 x 56 in),Sheldon Solow)
Study for Portrait on Folding Bed (Oil on canvas, 198.1 cm × 147.3 cm, Tate Gallery, London)
Study for Self Portrait (Oil on canvas, 165.2 x 142.6 cm (64.9 x 56.1 in), National Museum Cardiff, Cardiff)
Three Studies for the Portrait of Henrietta Moraes (Oil on canvas, each 35.9 x 30.8 cm (14 1/8 x 12 1/8 in), Museum of Modern Art, New York City) (small triptych)
1964
Study for the Portrait of Lucian Freud (Oil on canvas, 198 x 147.8 cm (78 x 54 in), Israel Museum, Jerusalem)
Three Figures in a Room 1964 (Oil on canvas, 198 x 147.5 cm (78 x 57 in), Musée National d'Art Moderne, Centre Georges Pompidou, Paris) (large triptych)
Study for Self-Portrait (Oil on canvas, 152.4 x 140 cm, (60 x 55 in), Private collection)
1965
Crucifixion (Oil and acrylic on canvas, 197.5 cm x 147 cm (78 x 58 in), Pinakothek der Moderne, Munich) (large triptych)
1966
Three Studies for a Portrait of Lucian Freud (Oil on canvas, 198 x 147.5 cm (78 x 57 in), Private collection) (large triptych)
Portrait of George Dyer Talking (Oil on canvas, 198.2 x 147.3 cm (78 x 58 in), Private collection)
Portrait of Isabel Rawsthorne (Oil on canvas, 81.3 cm × 68.6 cm, Tate Gallery, London)
c.1967
Untitled (Head) (Oil on canvas, 33.5 x 30.5 cm (14 x 12 in), Private collection)
1967
Study for Head of Lucian Freud (Oil on canvas, 36 cm × 30.5 cm, Private collection, long term loan to Tate Gallery, London)
Triptych inspired by T.S Elliot's Poem Sweeney Agonistes (Oil and pastel on canvas, 198 x 147.5 cm (78.25 x 57.25 in), Hirshhorn Museum and Sculpture Garden, Washington, D.C.) (large triptych)
Three Studies for George Dyer (1967)
Portrait of George Dyer and Lucian Freud (1967)
1968
Two Figures Lying on a Bed with Attendants (Oil and pastel on canvas, 198 x 147.5 cm (78 x 57 in), Tehran Museum of Contemporary Art, Tehran) (large triptych)
1969
Three Studies of Lucian Freud (Oil on canvas, 198 x 147.5 cm (78 x 57 in), Private collection) (large triptych)

1970s
1970
Triptych 1970 (Oil on canvas, 198 x 147.5 cm (78 x 57 in), National Gallery of Australia, Canberra) (large triptych)
Three Studies of the Male Back (Oil on canvas, 198 x 147.5 cm (78 x 57.5 in), Kunsthaus, Zurich)
Triptych – Studies of the Human Body (1970) (Oil on canvas, 198 x 147.5 cm (78 x 58.5 in), Private collection of Jacques Hachuel, Paris) (large triptych)
Triptych – Studies from the Human Body (1970) (Oil on canvas, 198 x 147.5 cm (78 x 57 in), Private collection of Jacques Hachuel, Paris) (large triptych)
1971
Study of Red Pope 1962. 2nd version 1971 (198 x 147.5 cm (78 x 58⅛ in)
In Memory of George Dyer (Oil on canvas, 198 x 147.5 cm (78 x 57 in), Beyler Foundation, Riehen, near Basel) (large triptych)
1972
Triptych–August 1972 (Oil on canvas, 198.1 x 147.3 cm, Tate Gallery, London)
Three Studies of Figures on Beds (Oil and tempere on canvas, 198 x 147.5 cm (78 x 57 in), Private collection) (large triptych)
1973
Three Portraits: Posthumous Portrait of George Dyer, Self-portrait, and Portrait of Lucian Freud (Oil on canvas, 198 x 147.5 cm (78 x 57 in), Beyler Foundation, Riehen, near Basel) (large triptych)
Triptych, May–June 1973 (Oil on canvas, 198 x 147.5 cm (78 x 57 in), Private collection of Esther Grether, Switzerland) (large triptych)
1974
Three Studies for Self-Portrait (Oil on canvas, 35.6 x 30.5 cm, (14 x 12 in), Private collection) (small triptych)
Triptych March 1974 (Oil on canvas, 198 x 147.5 cm (78 x 57 in), Private collection, Madrid) (large triptych)
Triptych 1974–1977 (Oil and pastel on canvas, 198 x 147.5 cm (78 x 57 in), Private collection of Joe Lewis) (large triptych)
1975
Three Studies for Self-Portrait (Oil on canvas, each 35.5 x 30.5 cm, (14 x 12 in), Private collection) (small triptych)
Three Figures and Portrait (Oil on canvas, 198.1 cm × 147.3 cm, Tate Gallery, London)
1976
Study for Self-Portrait (Oil on canvas, 198.0 x 147.5 cm (77.9 x 58 in), Art Gallery of New South Wales, Sydney)
Triptych 1976 (Oil on canvas, 198 x 147.5 cm (78 x 57 in), Private collection of Roman Abramovich) (large triptych)
1979
Triptych – Studies of the Human Body (1979) (Oil on canvas, 198 x 147.5 cm (78 x 57 in), Private collection) (large triptych)
1979–80
Three Studies for a Self-Portrait (Oil on canvas, each 37.5 cm × 31.8 cm (14 3/4 x 12.5 in), Metropolitan Museum of Art, New York City) (small triptych)

1980s
1981
Triptych inspired by the Oresteia of Aeschylus (Oil on canvas, 198 x 147.5 cm (78 x 58 in), Astrup Fearnley Museum of Modern Art, Oslo) (large triptych)
1981–82
Triptych November 1981 – January 1982 (left panel) (Oil, pastel and transfer lettering on canvas, 198 x 147.5 cm, Private collection, the Estate of Francis Bacon)
1982
Three Studies for Portrait (Mick Jagger) (Oil and pastel on canvas, each panel 35.5 x 30.5 cm (14 x 12 in), Private collection, New York City) (small triptych)
1983
Three Studies for a Self Portrait (Oil on canvas, 34.9 x 30.5 cm (13 3/4 x 12 in), Honolulu Museum of Art, Honolulu)
Triptych 1983 (Oil and pastel on canvas, 198 x 147.5 cm (78 x 57 in), Private collection of Juan Abelló) (large triptych)
1984
Three Studies for a Portrait of John Edwards (Oil on canvas, 198 x 147.5 cm (78 x 57 in), Private collection) (large triptych)
1986
Study for a Self-Portrait—Triptych, 1985–86 (Oil on canvas, 198 x 147.5 cm (78 x 57 in), Marlborough International Fine Art) (large triptych)
Portrait of Gilbert de Botton Speaking (Oil on canvas, Private collection)
1987
Triptych 86–87 (Oil on canvas, 198 x 147.5 cm (78 x 57 in), Private collection) (large triptych)
Triptych 1987 (Oil on canvas, 198 x 147.5 cm (78 x 57 in), Private collection of the Estate of Francis Bacon, London) (large triptych)
c.1988
Blood on Pavement (Oil on canvas, 198 cm × 147.5 cm, Private collection)
1988
Portrait of John Edwards (Oil on canvas, 198 cm × 147.5 cm, Private collection of the Estate of Francis Bacon, London)
Jet of Water (Oil on canvas, 198 cm × 147.5 cm, Private collection of Mr. and Mrs. J. Tomlinson Hill, New York)
Second Version of Triptych 1944 (Oil on canvas, 198 x 147.5 cm (78 x 57 in), Tate, London) (large triptych)

1990s
1991
Study for a Portrait March 1991 (Oil on canvas, 198 cm × 147.5 cm, Scottish National Gallery of Modern Art, Edinburgh)
Triptych 1991 (Oil on linen, 198.1 x 147.6 cm (78 x 57 in), Museum of Modern Art, New York City) (large triptych)

See also
 List of large triptychs by Francis Bacon

References

Bacon, Francis
Francis Bacon (artist)